Peter Michael Najarian is an options trader, television personality, market analyst, and co-founder of optionMONSTER, a provider of market intelligence, commentary, and trading strategies. Along with his brother, Jon Najarian, he founded an online brokerage called tradeMONSTER in October 2008, which sends trading information through the Web without requiring clients to download trading software. In 2016, Najarian co-founded Market Rebellion, a provider of options education, commentary, and trading strategies.

Najarian was a contributor on CNBC's show Fast Money alongside Guy Adami, Steve Grasso, Karen Finerman, and Tim Seymour, and has served on the NaturalShrimp, Inc. advisory board.

Biography
Najarian grew up in Minnesota, the son of transplant surgeon John Najarian.

Football career
Najarian played college football with the University of Minnesota Golden Gophers as a linebacker. He was named to the All-Big Ten second-team for three years, from 1983 to 1985, and was awarded the school's Carl Eller award for outstanding defensive player for three consecutive years, from 1983 to 1985. He also served as the team's captain in 1985. After earning a degree from the University of Minnesota, he became a professional football player with the Tampa Bay Buccaneers and Minnesota Vikings.
Pete also played for the Sacramento Surge and won a World Bowl in 1992

Post-playing career
Najarian became an options trader in 1992 with the encouragement of his brother, Jon Najarian, who worked for Mercury Trading at the Chicago Board Options Exchange. Peter Najarian became president of Mercury, a position he held from 2000 to 2004, and oversaw the company's sale to Citadel LLC.

He has appeared on the CNBC financial investing show Fast Money.

Beginning with the 2013 season he became a commentator for ESPN's college football coverage.

On February 17, 2021, aquaculture company NaturalShrimp, Inc. announced the appointment of Najarian to its advisory board.

References

External links
 
 

1963 births
Living people
American financial businesspeople
American football linebackers
Television personalities from San Francisco
CNBC people
Minnesota Golden Gophers football players
Minnesota Vikings players
Sacramento Surge players
Tampa Bay Buccaneers players
Players of American football from San Francisco
Players of American football from Minneapolis
American people of Armenian descent